John McEnroe was the defending champion and won in the final 6–4, 7–5, 6–2 against Roscoe Tanner.

Seeds

  John McEnroe (champion)
  Roscoe Tanner (final)
  Eliot Teltscher (semifinals)
  Peter McNamara (quarterfinals)
  Vitas Gerulaitis (quarterfinals)
  Victor Pecci (quarterfinals)
  Kim Warwick (first round)
  Tom Gullikson (quarterfinals)

Draw

Finals

Section 1

Section 2

External links
 1981 Custom Credit Australian Indoor Championships draw

Singles